Midlands 3 West (North) is a level 8 English Rugby Union league and level 3 of the Midlands League, made up of teams from the northern part of the West Midlands region including Shropshire, Staffordshire, parts of Birmingham and the West Midlands and occasionally Cheshire, with home and away matches played throughout the season.  When this division began in 1992 it was known as Midlands West 2, until it was split into two regional divisions called Midlands 4 West (North) and Midlands 4 West (South) ahead of the 2000–01 season.  Further restructuring of the Midlands leagues ahead of the 2009–10 season, led to the current name of Midlands 3 West (North).

Promoted teams tend to move up to Midlands 2 West (North) while demoted teams typically drop to Midlands 4 West (North).  Each year all clubs in the division also take part in the RFU Senior Vase - a level 8 national competition.

2021-22

Participating teams & locations

2020–21
Due to the COVID-19 pandemic, the 2020–21 season was cancelled.

2019–20

Participating teams & locations

2018–19

Participating teams & locations

2017–18

Participating teams & locations

Teams 2016-17
Burntwood
Cannock
Clee Hill 
Cleobury Mortimer 
Eccleshall	
Edwardians
Handsworth (relegated from Midlands 2 West (North))
Harborne (relegated from Midlands 2 West (North))
Ludlow	
Telford Hornets (promoted from Midlands 4 West (North))
Uttoxeter (promoted from Midlands 4 West (North))
Willenhall

Teams 2015-16
Bloxwich	
Burntwood
Cannock (promoted from Midlands 4 West (North))
Clee Hill 
Cleobury Mortimer (promoted from Midlands 4 West (North))
Eccleshall	
Edwardians
Ludlow (relegated from Midlands 2 West (North))
Newcastle (Staffs)	
Tamworth (relegated from Midlands 2 West (North))
Wednesbury
Willenhall

Teams 2014-15
Aston Old Edwardians (relegated from Midlands 2 West (North))
Bloxwich	
Burntwood	
Clee Hill (promoted from Midlands 4 West (North))
Eccleshall	
Edwardians
Handsworth
Harborne (promoted from Midlands 4 West (North))
Newcastle (Staffs)	
Uttoxeter
Wednesbury
Willenhall (relegated from Midlands 2 West (North))

Teams 2013-14
Bloxwich
Burntwood
Eccleshall
Edwardians
Handsworth
Market Drayton (promoted from Midlands 4 West (North))
Newcastle (Staffs)
Shrewsbury
Uttoxeter (promoted from Midlands 4 West (North))
Veseyans (relegated from Midlands 2 West (North))
Wednesbury
Yardley & District

Teams 2012–13
Bloxwich
Burntwood
Cleobury Mortimer
Eccleshall
Edwardians
Handsworth
Newcastle (Staffs)
Shrewsbury
Stourbridge Lions
Wednesbury
Willenhall
Yardley & District

Teams 2010–11
Bishops Castle & Onny Valley
Burntwood
Eccleshall
Handsworth
Moseley Oak
Newcastle (Staffs)
Telford
Uttoxeter
Veseyans
Wednesbury
Wolverhampton
Yardley & District

Original teams

Teams in Midlands 3 West (North) and Midlands 3 West (South) were originally part of a single division called Midlands 2 West, which contained the following sides when it was introduced in 1992:

Aston Old Edwardians - promoted from North Midlands 1 (10th)
Coventry Welsh - promoted from Staffordshire/Warwickshire 1 (10th)
Dixonians - promoted from North Midlands 1 (6th)
Handsworth - promoted from Staffordshire 1 (champions)
Kenilworth - promoted from Staffordshire/Warwickshire 1 (7th)
Nuneaton Old Edwardians - promoted from Staffordshire/Warwickshire 1 (6th)
Old Laurentians - promoted from Warwickshire 1 (champions)
Selly Oak - promoted from North Midlands 2 (champions)
Shrewsbury - promoted from North Midlands 1 (11th)
Stratford-upon-Avon - promoted from Staffordshire/Warwickshire 1 (9th)
Tamworth - promoted from Staffordshire/Warwickshire 1 (8th)
West Midlands Police - promoted from North Midlands 1 (8th)
Woodrush - promoted from North Midlands 1 (7th)

Midlands 3 West (North) honours

Midlands West 2 (1992–1993)

Midlands 3 West (North) and Midlands 3 West (South) were originally part of a single tier 8 division called Midlands West 2.  Promotion was to Midlands West 1 and relegation was to either North Midlands 1 or Staffordshire/Warwickshire 1.

Midlands West 2 (1993–1996)

The top six teams from Midlands 1 and the top six from North 1 were combined to create National 5 North, meaning that Midlands 2 West dropped to become a tier 9 league.  Promotion continued to Midlands West 1 while relegation was to either North Midlands 1 or Staffordshire/Warwickshire 1.

Midlands West 2 (1996–2000)

At the end of the 1995–96 season National 5 North was discontinued and Midlands West 2 returned to being a tier 8 league.  Promotion continued to Midlands West 1 while relegation was to either North Midlands 1 or Staffordshire/Warwickshire 1.

Midlands 4 West (North) (2000–2004)

Restructuring ahead of the 2000–01 season saw Midlands West 2 split into two tier 8 regional leagues - Midlands 4 West (North) and Midlands 4 West (South).  Promotion was now to Midlands 3 West (North) and relegation to either North Midlands 1 or Staffordshire 1.

Midlands 4 West (North) (2004–2006)

At the start of the 2004–05 season Midlands 4 West (North) remained at tier 8 of the league system, with promotion continuing to Midlands 3 West (North).  However, the restructuring of the leagues below meant that relegation was now to either North Midlands (North) or Staffordshire

Midlands 4 West (North) (2006–2009)

At the start of the 2006–07 season Midlands 4 West (North) remained at tier 8 of the league system, with promotion continuing to Midlands 3 West (North).  The cancellation of the Staffordshire league meant that relegation was now to the newly introduced Midlands 5 West (North).

Midlands 3 West (North) (2009–present)

League restructuring by the RFU meant that Midlands 4 West (North) and Midlands 4 West (South) were renamed as Midlands 3 West (North) and Midlands 3 West (South), with both leagues remaining at tier 8.  Promotion was now to Midlands 2 West (North) (formerly Midlands 3 West (North)) and relegation to Midlands 4 West (North) (formerly Midlands 5 West (North)).

Number of league titles

Telford Hornets (3)
Burntwood (2)
Leek (2)
Newcastle (Staffs) (2)
Shrewsbury (2)
Veseyans (2)
Willenhall (2)
Bridgnorth (1) 
Handsworth (1)
Kidderminster Carolians (1)
Ludlow (1)
Luctonians (1)
Nuneaton Old Edwardians (1)
Old Halesonians (1)
Old Laurentians (1)
Old Saltleians (1)
Selly Oak (1)
Tamworth (1)
Uttoxeter (1)
Wednesbury (1)

See also
Midlands RFU
North Midlands RFU
Staffordshire RU
English rugby union system
Rugby union in England

Notes

References

Rugby First: To view previous seasons in the league, search for any club within that league then click on to club details followed by fixtures and then select the appropriate season.

8
4